"King Nine Will Not Return" is the season two premiere episode, and 37th overall, of the American television anthology series The Twilight Zone. It originally aired on September 30, 1960 on CBS.

This was the first episode where Rod Serling appeared on camera at the beginning, rather than introducing the episode in a voice-over narration.

Opening narration

Plot
It's World War II, and the King Nine, a B-25 Mitchell bomber, has crashed in the desert. Captain James Embry finds himself stranded, alone except for the wreckage and the mystery of what happened to his crew, all of whom have disappeared. The movement of the plane in the wind and his visions of the missing men serve to heighten Embry's disorientation.

While searching for his crew, Embry finds the grave of one of his men, and recognizes in the sky Navy F9F Cougar jets, which are impossible for 1943. He is bewildered as to how he knows about jet aircraft and becomes increasingly distressed. Embry collapses in the sand, and it is revealed that he is apparently hospitalized and suffering hallucinations, 17 years after the crash.

Confident that Embry will recover, two doctors discuss their speculation that his suffering has been triggered by a newspaper headline. The paper has reported the desert discovery of the long-lost King Nine, which had not returned to base from a wartime mission in 1943. Having come down with a fever just before he was to board the ill-fated flight, Embry had been replaced on the mission by another captain. Seeing the headline has triggered survivor guilt, the intensity of which has caused him to imagine himself at the crash site.

The doctors assure Embry he has returned to the site only in his mind. However, when a nurse handling his clothes accidentally turns one of his shoes on its side, sand spills out.

Closing narration

Cast
Bob Cummings as Captain James Embry
Gene Lyons as Psychiatrist
Paul Lambert as Doctor
Jenna McMahon as Nurse

Production notes

This was the first episode to feature the familiar Marius Constant Twilight Zone theme. The score by Fred Steiner was later used in other Twilight Zone episodes.

The episode was based on the discovery of the B-24 Liberator bomber Lady Be Good and her crew's remains, which had crash-landed at night, deep in the Libyan desert after running out of fuel, while returning from a World War II bombing mission over Naples, Italy. In the episode, the marker of a grave of a member of the crew of King Nine is dated "5 April 1943," the day on which the Lady Be Good was lost.  Lady Be Good had been found in 1958, and the bodies of 8 of the 9-man crew were discovered between February and August 1960 – the eighth crewman being found just a few weeks before "King Nine Will Not Return" aired.

The bomber aircraft used in this episode was  a North American Aviation B-25C-10NA 42-32354, which still exists in storage with Aero Trader, Borrego Springs, California.

Short story adaptation
"King Nine Will Not Return" was adapted into short story form by Walter B. Gibson in the 1963 collection Rod Serling's Twilight Zone as "Return From Oblivion". Despite the different title, it follows the plot of the television version precisely, with no significant changes.

See also 
 List of The Twilight Zone (1959 TV series) episodes
 Sole Survivor (1970)

References

Further reading
Zicree, Marc Scott: The Twilight Zone Companion. Sillman-James Press, 1982 (second edition)
DeVoe, Bill. (2008). Trivia from The Twilight Zone. Albany, GA: Bear Manor Media. 
Grams, Martin. (2008). The Twilight Zone: Unlocking the Door to a Television Classic. Churchville, Md.: OTR Publishing.

External links
 

The Twilight Zone (1959 TV series season 2) episodes
Television episodes about World War II
1960 American television episodes
Television episodes written by Rod Serling
Fiction set in 1943
Television episodes set in Africa